The Riverbluff Cave is a paleontological site discovered in the United States, near Springfield, Missouri. The entrance is filled with stalactites, stalagmites and columns. The cave is about 830,000 years old (making it the oldest known fossil cave site in the US) and 610 m long, featuring Pleistocene fossils, notably of the short-faced bear (Artcodus simus) the largest bear species on the Earth (around 5–6 feet tall at the shoulder and weighing in the area of 2,000 pounds).

The cave Is located in the widespread karst landscape of the Springfield Plateau of the western Missouri Ozarks and developed within the soluble Mississippian limestones of the region. It was unveiled accidentally on September 11, 2001, when engineers were blasting for a new road.

The cave is not open to the public, but is the world's second cave to be wired for virtual tours.  The Riverbluff Cave Field House opened in 2009 with exhibits of fossils from Riverbluff Cave and from around the world.

References

External links
RiverbluffCave.com
Riverbluff Cave: A Walk through the Ice Age
The Riverbluff Cave paleontological site and its importance as an educational tool
Missouri Cave Is an Ice Age Time Capsule from American National Public Radio

Caves of Missouri
2001 in science
Museums in Greene County, Missouri
Natural history museums in Missouri
Protected areas of Greene County, Missouri
Paleontology in Missouri
Fossil museums